Megachile versicolor is a species of bee in the family Megachilidae. It was described by Smith in 1844.

References

Versicolor
Insects described in 1844